Benjamin F. Boswell (March 4, 1910 – May 30, 1968) was an American football offensive lineman in the National Football League for the Portsmouth Spartans and Boston Redskins. Born in Fort Worth, Texas, he played college football at Texas Christian University.

References
Ben Boswell's obituary

1910 births
1968 deaths
People from Fort Worth, Texas
American football offensive linemen
Portsmouth Spartans players
Boston Redskins players
TCU Horned Frogs football players